Proxim (also known by its corporate name Groupe PharmEssor) is a Canadian group of pharmacists located in Quebec and to a lesser extent in Ontario and the Maritimes provinces.
 
All Proxim stores are owned by independent pharmacists that comply with Proxim's business rules and practices. Proxim's private brand is called "Atoma" and the company also has its loyalty card program.

There are close to 270 drug stores in Eastern Canada that carry the Proxim name.

History
In August 2004, two companies - Groupe Essaim and Gestion Santé Services Obonsoins Inc—regrouped to form Groupe PharmEssor. The three pharmacy chains affected by this merger - Essaim, Obonsoins and Santé Services—were initially kept separate and intact by PharmEssor. However, in February 2006, PharmEssor consolidated all of its operations under a single banner, Proxim, hence eliminating the previous banners. The name "Proxim" was inspired from the word “proximity” to describe the group's great accessibility to pharmaceutical cares.

One year after the creation of Proxim, the Proximed banner was created in February 2007. Thus, an estimate of 31 selected locations operate today under the name Proximed.

On July 1, 2008,  McKesson Canada acquired Proxim. In September 2017, McKesson Canada completed its acquisition of Uniprix which would be headed by the same president who oversees the Proxim chain. Proxim and Uniprix have since remained separate chains of McKesson, much the same way that competitors Jean Coutu and Brunet both live on within the ownership of Metro Inc.

References

Notes

External links 
 

Companies based in Boucherville
Canadian pharmacy brands